Henry Braid Wilson, Jr. (23 February 1861 – 30 January 1954) was an admiral in the United States Navy during World War I.

Biography
Wilson was a native of Camden, New Jersey. He joined the United States Navy in the latter part of the nineteenth century and continued to serve for over forty years.

During World War I, he served as commander, Patrol Forces, Atlantic Fleet and then commander, U.S. Naval Forces, France. After the World War he served as Commander-In-Chief of the Atlantic Fleet 1919–1921, Commander-In-Chief of the U.S. Battle Fleet and later superintendent of the U.S. Naval Academy 1921–1925. Two notable students of his at the academy were cadets and future Admiral Hyman G. Rickover, class of 1922, and Admiral Arleigh A. Burke, class of 1923. Wilson retired in 1925, following forty-four years of service.

Wilson died in 1954 in New York City; at the time of his death he was the oldest living admiral of the United States Navy. He was buried at Arlington National Cemetery.

Wilson's son-in-law was Hoover Administration United States Secretary of War and Major General Patrick J. Hurley.

Medals and commendations

Namesake and honors
USS Henry B. Wilson (DDG-7), a guided missile destroyer, was named for him.
A portion of U.S. Route 30 in New Jersey passing through Camden, New Jersey, Admiral Wilson Boulevard.

References

History of the Fleet Forces Command, formerly the U.S. Atlantic Fleet
Camden People - Admiral Henry Braid Wilson Jr.
short bio from DANFS
DANFS History of U.S.S. Pennsylvania BB-38
INSERV Presidents 
US Navy Biography of Admiral Henry B. Wilson 

1861 births
1954 deaths
People from Camden, New Jersey
United States Naval Academy alumni
American military personnel of the Spanish–American War
United States Navy personnel of World War I
United States Navy admirals
Recipients of the Distinguished Service Medal (US Army)
Recipients of the Navy Distinguished Service Medal
Superintendents of the United States Naval Academy
Burials at Arlington National Cemetery
Military personnel from New Jersey